The New Stadionul Dinamo is a proposed football stadium in Bucharest, Romania. 

The contract for the feasibility study was signed in September 2020. The works will last between 18 and 24 months. Initially CS Dinamo București handed over to CNI the location of the current velodrome for which the public procurement procedure was started.

See also
List of football stadiums in Romania 
List of European stadia by capacity
List of future stadiums

References
 

 

 
Proposed stadiums 
Sports venues in Romania 
Proposed buildings and structures in Romania
21st century in Romania